The Shenyang–Baihe high-speed railway is a proposed high-speed railway in China. The railway is expected to open in 2025.

History
Preliminary research into the project began in September 2015. Construction started in October 2020.

Stations

References

High-speed railway lines in China
High-speed railway lines under construction